The Yugoslav Progressive Nationalist Youth (JNNO)  was an interwar fascist youth movement in the Kingdom of Serbs, Croats and Slovenes established in Split in 1921. The YPNY general affiliation was independent. Although JNNO itself quickly failed, it led to the creation of two dissenting youth organisations in 1922 by the People's Radical Party: the Serbian National Youth (SRNAO) and the Croatian National Youth (HANAO).

References

Organizations based in Yugoslavia
Fascism in Yugoslavia
Yugoslavism